Magician Among the Spirits is the tenth album by the Australian alternative rock band The Church, released in August 1996. The album title was inspired by a book written by Harry Houdini and C. M. Eddy, Jr. (uncredited) in 1924, in which the famed magician discussed his investigations of spirit mediums. A photographic negative of Houdini is incorporated as the centrepiece of the album artwork. The album was reissued with a revised track listing as Magician Among the Spirits And Some in 1999.

Without a recording deal after Sometime Anywhere, the band's future looked bleak as Kilbey and Willson-Piper began work on new recordings in 1995. Although initially a two-man project, the new material saw input from new drummer Tim Powles and hired violinist Linda Neil. Renewed contact between Kilbey and Peter Koppes led to the latter agreeing to guest on four songs, despite having left the band in 1992. Simon Polinski (Yothu Yindi) was drafted in to co-produce, engineer and mix the sessions. The music saw a return to guitar-based material, infused with krautrock and art rock influences. A 15-minute atmospheric piece called "Magician Among the Spirits" dominated the sessions, featuring Koppes on guitar and split Kilbey/Willson-Piper vocals (as on "Two Places at Once"). Contributions from Utungun Percussion added a new, primal aspect to several songs.

The album was released on the band's own Deep Karma label but due to financial constraints they had to arrange outside distribution for markets in North America and Europe. This limitation almost doomed the album from the beginning, but worse events were to come. Within a short time, the U.S. distributor went bankrupt, leaving the band stripped of its earnings from North American sales. Although exact figures remain unknown due to disputes, up to A$250,000 worth of merchandise (some 25,000 discs) was lost. For a band already on shaky foundations, this was nearly the death knell. Comments by Kilbey in May of that year summed up the situation: "There's no immediate future for The Church ... Our management, the whole thing is broken down ... We don't really have a label. We're owed lots and lots of money and we're broke. We're trying to pursue lawyers to get our money back. Marty and I aren't having any communication. There's no one really managing us so ... that could have been the last record."

Original 1996 track listing

"Welcome" (Kilbey, Willson-Piper) - 5:58
"Comedown" (Kilbey) - 4:35
"Ritz" (Steve Harley) - 7:54
"Grandiose" (Instrumental - Kilbey, Willson-Piper, Koppes, Powles, Neil) - 5:21
"Ladyboy" (Kilbey, Willson-Piper, Powles) - 5:56
"It Could Be Anyone" (Kilbey, Willson-Piper) - 8:45
"The Further Adventures of the Time Being" (Kilbey, Willson-Piper, Powles) - 6:00
"Romany Caravan" (Instrumental - Kilbey, Willson-Piper, Powles, Neil) - 4:06
"Magician among The Spirits" (Kilbey, Willson-Piper, Koppes, Powles) - 14:08
"Afterimage" (Instrumental - Kilbey, Willson-Piper) - 4:16

Magician Among the Spirits Plus Some

Magician Among the Spirits And Some is a 1999 expanded reissue of The Church's 1996 album, Magician Among the Spirits. It replaces the Cockney Rebel cover "Ritz" with four tracks from the "Comedown" single. The expanded album bears the title "...and Some" in the UK, Italy and Canada, "...plus Some" in the US.

1999 version track listing
"Welcome" (Kilbey/Willson-Piper) - 5:58
"Comedown" (Kilbey) - 4:35
"Man" (Kilbey/Willson-Piper/Koppes/Powles) - 5:24
"Won't Let You Sleep" (Kilbey/Willson-Piper/Koppes/Powles) - 5:17
"SADS" (Kilbey/Willson-Piper/Powles/Polinski) - 4:09
"Grandiose" (Instrumental - Kilbey/Willson-Piper/Koppes/Powles/Neil) - 5:21
"Ladyboy" (Kilbey/Willson-Piper/Powles) - 5:56
"Why Don't You Love Me" (Kilbey/Willson-Piper/Powles) - 5:53
"It Could Be Anyone" (Kilbey/Willson-Piper) - 8:45
"The Further Adventures of the Time Being" (Kilbey/Willson-Piper/Powles) - 6:00
"Romany Caravan" (Instrumental - Kilbey/Willson-Piper/Powles/Neil) - 4:06
"Magician among The Spirits" (Kilbey/Willson-Piper/Koppes/Powles) - 14:08
"Afterimage" (Instrumental - Kilbey/Willson-Piper) - 4:16

Personnel 

Steve Kilbey – lead vocals, bass guitar, keyboards, guitar
Marty Willson-Piper – guitars, bass guitar, backing vocals
Tim Powles – drums, percussion, bass guitar, backing vocals
with
Peter Koppes – guitars
Linda Neil – violin

Charts

References 

The Church (band) albums
1996 albums
1999 albums